Early Serbian Music is a Cassette and Videocassette album by Ensemble Renaissance, released in 1989 on the PGP RTB label. It is their third album with early music of Serbia and their 7th album overall.
Similar to the concept of their first album on the A side of the record are secular songs and dances from the Eastern Serbia and Kosovo. The B side of the cassette deals with Serbian chant in the period of Ottoman rule and Great Serbian Migrations.

Content
During the Turkish occupation from the mid-fifteenth century onward, the people sang to the gusle, played the tamburitza, zurle, tapan and others, far from the prying eyes of their conquerors. Well-known Serbian players of the gusle sojourned in the Polish royal courts of the sixteenth and seventeenth centuries, and later on in the Ukraine and in Hungary. Thus, continuity with the past was maintained and the ground prepared for the renaissance of Serbian music.

Although ecclesiastical eight-part melodies were sung, along with some other church songs, those melodies were created after the models of the fifteenth century. There is a likelihood that church singing in the Ottoman period was done on the basis of the late Byzantine tradition and on the basis of Serbian folk singing. Under the Russian influence, forms of non-liturgical music such as chants appeared in Serbian dramas. In Belgrade, under Austrian rule at the time, a Greek singing school was founded in 1721, and at the end of the eighteenth and beginning of the nineteenth centuries, the Karlowitz style of church singing was developed in Sremski Karlovci, the see of the Serbian metropolis.

Track listing
All tracks produced by Ensemble Renaissance

Personnel
The following people contributed to Early Serbian music
Ljudmila Gross-Marić 
Vojka Đorđević 
Dragan Mlađenović 
Georges Grujić 
Ljubomir Dimitrijević 
Gordana Kostić 
Stanimir Spasojević

References

1989 albums
Ensemble Renaissance albums